The Museum of the Qasr Prison ( muze-ye zendān-e qasr) is a historical complex in Tehran, Iran.

Formerly referred to as the Qasr Prison ( zendān-e qasr, "Mansion prison"), it was one of the oldest political prisons in Iran, which is now a museum complex surrounded by a public park.

History

Qasr was originally built in 1790 as a palace with extensive gardens of which nothing but the names remain, in the reign of Fath-ali Shah of the Qajar dynasty. In 1929 it was repurposed as a prison, the first modern detention center in the country, in which prisoners had legal rights. Nikolai Markov, a Georgian architect who settled in Iran after the Russian Revolution, did the rebuild, combining urban industrial design with traditional Iranian features such as adobe bricks, which became known as Markovian bricks. It had 192 rooms for 700 prisoners, of which about 100 cells were solitary. Here Ahmad Ahmadi, known to prisoners simply as “Dr Ahmadi” administered lethal air injections to several of Reza Shah's many opponents, such as the poet Mohammad Farrokhi Yazdi. After Reza Shah was overthrown by the Anglo-Soviet invasion of Iran in 1941, Ahmadi himself was tried for the murders and executed in 1943.

For Mohammad Reza Shah, it served as a torture and execution chamber for extreme political crimes which by the late 1970s was extensively reformed by the Red Cross into what was described a “hotel” by the staff. In its cells Ayatollah Khomeini, Ali Khamenei, Morteza Motahhari and Ayatollah Taleqani were held. On 11 February 1979 1,000 women were released from the prison. Following the 1979 Revolution, many civil and military officials of Mohammad Reza Pahlavi were detained and executed at the prison, including Nader Jahanbani and Amir Hossein Rabi'i; Major General Manuchechr Khosrodad and Prime Minister Amir Abbas Hoveida were imprisoned at Qasr before being executed on the roof of Refah School, where Khomeini had set up his headquarters.

In subsequent decades the prison fell into disuse till in 2005 it was announced by the ICHTO that the compound would become a museum. In 2008 it was donated to the municipal government. Reopened in 2012, the former prison buildings and offices were turned into museum buildings, surrounded by a public park which carries the same name. It hosts many cultural events such as the Nowrooz festival. According to the Iranian Students News Agency Qasr was named the most creative museum in the country in 2013.

Gallery

See also

 National Garden, Tehran
 National Museum of Iran
 Ferdows Garden

References

Museums in Tehran
Prisons in Iran
Buildings and structures in Tehran
Prison museums in Asia